Oberhöfen is a small part of a town called Warthausen, in eastern Baden-Württemberg, Germany.

References

Towns in Baden-Württemberg